The 2017 Première ligue de soccer du Québec season is the sixth season of play for the Première ligue de soccer du Québec, a Division 3 semi-professional soccer league in the Canadian soccer pyramid and the highest level of soccer based in the Canadian province of Québec.

CS Mont-Royal Outremont was the defending champion from 2016.

AS Blainville won the league championship this season.

Changes from 2016 
For the third season running, the league will feature a total of seven teams.  Dynamo de Québec & CS St-Hubert will begin their first season in the league, while Lakeshore SC & Ottawa Fury FC Academy departed after the 2016 season.

Starting this year, the league champion was granted a place in the next year's Canadian Championship.  As a result, the Inter-Provincial Cup was discontinued.

Teams 
The following seven teams will take part in the 2017 season:

Standings 
Each team played 18 matches as part of the season; three against every other team in the league.  There are no playoffs; the first-place team is crowned as league champion at the end of the season and qualifies for the 2018 Canadian Championship.

Statistics

Top goalscorers 

Updated to matches played on 22 October 2017.  Source:

Top goalkeepers 

Updated to matches played on October 22, 2017.  Minimum 450 minutes played.  Source:

Awards

Cup 
The cup tournament is a separate contest from the rest of the season, in which all seven teams from the league take part, and is unrelated to the season standings.  It is not a form of playoffs at the end of the season (as is typically seen in North American sports), but is a competition running in parallel to the regular season (similar to the Canadian Championship or the FA Cup), albeit only for PLSQ teams.  All matches are separate from the regular season, and are not reflected in the season standings.

The 2017 PLSQ Cup maintained the same format as the previous seasons, as a two-game aggregate knockout tournament with a single match final.  As defending champion, AS Blainville were granted a bye for the first round.

First round

Semifinals

Final

Reserve Division
The league operated a reserve division.

Awards

References

External links 

Premiere
Première ligue de soccer du Québec seasons